AKM Salim Reza Habib is a Bangladesh Nationalist Party politician and the former Member of Parliament of Pabna-2.

Career
Habib was elected to parliament from Pabna-2 as a Bangladesh Nationalist Party candidate in 2001.

References

Bangladesh Nationalist Party politicians
Living people
8th Jatiya Sangsad members
People from Sujanagar Upazila
6th Jatiya Sangsad members
Year of birth missing (living people)